Quzlujeh may refer to:
 Quzlujeh, Ajab Shir, East Azerbaijan Province
 Quzlujeh, Maragheh, East Azerbaijan Province
 Quzllujeh, East Azerbaijan Province
 Quzlujeh, Hamadan
 Quzlujeh, Shahin Dezh, West Azerbaijan Province